Essenwood is a central suburb of Durban, KwaZulu-Natal, South Africa. It is administered by the eThekwini Metropolitan Municipality.

References

Suburbs of Durban